Megachile hilli is a species of bee in the family Megachilidae. It was described by Theodore Dru Alison Cockerell in 1929.

References

Hilli
Insects described in 1929